James Hutchins may refer to:

James Hutchins (Latter Day Saints) (c. 1810–1874), Church of Jesus Christ of Latter Day Saints (Strangite) apostle
James H. Hutchins, New York politician
James W. Hutchins (1929–1984), American murderer, executed in North Carolina

See also
Jamie Hutchings (born 1971), singer
James Mason Hutchings (1820–1902), American businessman
James Hutchins Johnson (1802–1887), U.S. Representative from New Hampshire